Norick Blödorn (born 1 June 2004) is a speedway rider from Germany. He rode in the top tier of British Speedway riding for the Belle Vue Aces in the SGB Premiership 2022 where he won a league title.

In 2022, he became the youngest ever German national champion and competed in 2022 SGP2.

After a successful first season with Belle Vue he re-signed for them for the SGB Premiership 2023.

References 

2004 births
Living people
German speedway riders
Belle Vue Aces riders
People from Neumünster